Football Club Nevers 58, also known simply as Nevers, is an association football club based in the town of Nevers, France. The club was founded in 1948 and their home stadium is the Stade des Senets, with a capacity of 1,500. As of the 2010–11 season, Nevers play in the Division d'Honneur de Bourgogne, the sixth tier of French football.

History
Nevers Football knew its heyday in the 1970s. Notably, the club played twice in Ligue 2, during the 1973–74 season and then in the 1975–76 season. Nearly three decades later, under manager Daniel Bréard, Nevers won the Division d'Honneur de Bourgogne in 2009 and were promoted to the Championnat de France amateur 2, the fifth tier of French football, for the 2009–10 season. Despite a reinforced squad, Nevers was relegated back to the DH Bourgogne for the 2010–11 season.

Honours
.

Domestic
 Division d'Honneur de Bourgogne: 1
2009

References

External links
Nevers–Football.fr

Association football clubs established in 1948
1948 establishments in France
Nevers
Football clubs in Bourgogne-Franche-Comté
Sport in Nièvre